Crawler may refer to:

 Web crawler, a computer program that gathers and categorizes information on the World Wide Web
 A first-instar nymph of a scale insect that has legs and walks around before it attaches itself and becomes stationary
 Crawler (BEAM) in robotics 
 A type of crane on tracks
 "Crawlers" (Into the Dark), an episode of the second season of Into the Dark
The Crawler, an episode of the cartoon Extreme Ghostbusters
 Crawler (album), an album by IDLES
 Crawler (band), a British rock band
 Crawlers (band), a British rock band 
 A fictional creature in the video game Fable III
 A fictional creature in the movie The Descent

See also
 Bottom crawler, an underwater exploration and recovery vehicle
 Crawl (disambiguation)
 Crawler-transporter, a large tracked vehicle used by NASA to transport spacecraft
  Nightcrawler (Lumbricus terrestris), an annelid worm also called "common earthworm" and "dew worm"